Wong Wai Kwok (born 20 May 1999) is a Hong Kong professional footballer who plays as a left winger for Hong Kong Premier League club Resources Capital.

References

External links
HKFA

Hong Kong footballers
Hong Kong First Division League players
Hong Kong Premier League players
Association football midfielders
Association football wingers
Resources Capital FC players
1999 births
Living people